Alph Lake lies at the foot of Ward Valley on the north-west side of Koettlitz Glacier, Scott Coast, Antarctica. It was named by Griffith Taylor of the British Antarctic Expedition, 1910–13, led by Captain Robert Falcon Scott, in association with Alph River, which flows through the lake.

References 

Lakes of Victoria Land
Scott Coast